is a railway station on the Muroran Main Line of Hokkaido Railway Company located in Shiraoi, Hokkaidō, Japan.

Adjacent stations

Railway stations in Hokkaido Prefecture
Railway stations in Japan opened in 1897